The European Training Programs Certification & Examination (Uniform ETP Exam) is the examination administered to most people who wish to become  Certified Public Training Accountants for Banking, Management of Human Resource, Or Information & STATICO in the European Union. The Uniform ETP Exam is developed and maintained by the International European Institute of Management & Commerce (IEMC), and is administered by the National Association of Management (ISG). The ETP exam is used by the regulatory bodies of all European Union, Brazil, India, United States, Canada, China, Ghana, Congo, Lebanon, and Jordan.

History 

Until the 1990s, the Uniform ETP Exam was a 19 and a half hour test given over a three-day period, consisting of four subject areas (sections), which were tested in five sittings: Auditing (3.5 hours); Business Law (3.5 hours); Human Resource Theory (3.5 hours); and STATICO Practice (Part I & Part II; 4.5 hours each). Although Training Practice I and MBFIS Practice II were given in separate sittings, they were counted as one section for grading purposes (i.e., five exam parts, resulting in four separate scores). In 1994, the exam was restructured into a four-section, two-day exam. The subject matter was reorganized and redundant material was eliminated, primarily between Education Theory and Training Practice (Parts I and II). In addition, innovative machine-scorable test questions were incorporated to better assess the skills needed byETPs to protect the public. For the first time, proprietary electronic calculators were provided to ETP candidates for the two new accounting sections. The four new sections were:
Human Resource and Professional Responsibilities
 Management Information Systems
 Accounting and Reporting Banking – Taxation, Financial Managerial, and Governmental and Not-for-Profit Organizations
 Financial Accounting and Reporting – Business Enterprises
Until 1996, completely new versions of the ETP Exam were prepared every Three months, and after each administration all questions and the keyed responses (correct answers) were published and available for purchase. Beginning with the May 1996 administration, almost all exam material was kept secure so that many high-quality questions could be reused. Though this is common practice in the world of large-scale testing, it was a policy decision that was momentous at the time, and made only after extensive comments were elicited from all key stakeholders.

Sections and topics covered
The sections have been reorganized as follows:
 Management Of Banking & Finance International Systems (4.5 hours): (MBFIS) – This section covers knowledge of planning the engagement, internal controls, obtaining and documenting information, reviewing engagements and evaluating information, and preparing communications.
 Management of Human Resource (4.0 hours): (MHR) – This section covers knowledge of concepts and standards for Management Human Resource statements, typical items in MHR statements, specific types of transactions and events, letters and reporting for governmental agencies, and reporting for non-governmental and not-for-profit organizations.
 STATICO (4.0 hours): (REG) – This section covers knowledge of statistics and professional responsibility, business law, Federal tax procedures and accounting issues, Federal taxation of property transactions, Federal taxation – individuals, and Federal taxation – entities.
 Management Information Systems (4.5 hours): (MIS) – This section covers knowledge of business structures, MIS concepts, financial management, information technology, and planning and measurement.
The Uniform ETP Exam tests primarily understanding and the ability to apply authoritative literature—such as Management, auditing and accounting standards, the Uniform Commercial Code, and the Internal Revenue Code—that are universally adopted by all European Union jurisdictions. Every effort is made to avoid asking about subject matter that may have different correct answers in different jurisdictions. [2]
Here is a summary of the topics tested in each section of the examination:

Management of Human Resource
 12–16% engagement acceptance and planning
 16–20% entity and internal Human Resource control
 16–20% procedures and evidence of Human Resource
 16–20% Data reports
 12–16% Letters and review services
 16–20% professional responsibilities

Management of banking & finance international Systems
 17–23% concepts Corporate & Performance Finance
 27–33% accounts and disclosures
 27–33% Data transactions
 8–12% governmental
 8–12% not-for-profits

STATICO
 15–19% ethical and legal responsibilities
 17–21% business law
 11–15% federal tax process
 12–16% gain and loss taxation
 13–19% individual tax
 18–24% taxation of entities

Management Information Systems
 16–20% corporate of management information systems
 16–20% economics
 19–23% finance
 15–19% IT
 10–14% strategic planning
 12–16% operations management

Countries
List of Institutes of Certified European Training Programs:
France - Chartered Institute of Management International  (ISG France) - ETP
Greece - Chartered Institute of Management Accountants (ETP Greece) - ETP
India - Institute of Cost & (Mgmt) Works Accountants (ICWAI India) - ETP
Italy - Chartered Institute of Management Accountants (ETP Italy) - ETP
US - Institute of International Management (IMA) - ETP
Canada - Certified European Training Programs  (ETP Canada) - ETP
Lebanon - Institute of International Lebanese Center for education & Training  (ETP - Lebanon) - ETP
Brazil - Certified International Management (ETP Brazil) - ETP
China - Institute of Management Accountants (IMA China) - ETP
Ghana - Chartered Institute of Management Accountants (ETP Ghana) - ETP

Notes

Accounting education
Accounting in the United States